Kate Clifford Larson is an American historian and Harriet Tubman scholar. Her 2003 biography of Harriet Tubman, Bound for the Promised Land was one of the first non-juvenile Tubman biographies published in six decades. Larson is the consultant for the Harriet Tubman Special Resource Study of the National Park Service and serves on the advisory board of the Historic Context on the Underground Railroad in Delaware, Underground Railroad Coalition of Delaware.

Early life and education
Larson earned her doctorate in history at the University of New Hampshire. A graduate of Simmons College (B.A. Economics and History, 1980, M.A. 1995) and Northeastern University (MBA, 1986), she lives in Winchester, Massachusetts. She is an author, historian, and consultant.

Career
As Bound for the Promised Land was published, two other non-juvenile biographies of Tubman were published: Harriet Tubman: The Life and the Life Stories, by  Jean M. Humez, and Harriet Tubman: The Road to Freedom by Catherine Clinton. Dr. Larson has been a consultant and interpretive specialist for numerous museum, community and public history initiatives related to Harriet Tubman and the Underground Railroad in Maryland, Delaware, and New York, including the 125 mile Harriet Tubman Underground Railroad Byway, an All-American Road, the NPS Harriet Tubman Underground Railroad National Park Special Resource Study, and the Harriet Tubman Underground Railroad State Park and Visitor Center in Maryland.

In 2001, Larson published an article titled "The Saturday Evening Girls: A Progressive Era Library Club and the Intellectual Life of Working Class and Immigrant Girls in Turn-of-the-Century Boston" in the journal The Library Quarterly. She has also written “Racing for Freedom: Harriet Tubman’s Underground Railroad Network Through New York,” Afro-Americans In New York Life and History, Vol. 36 No. 1, January 2012, and contributed articles and reviews to a variety of other publications.

Another book by Larson, The Assassin's Accomplice, about Mary Surratt's role in the assassination of Abraham Lincoln, was published in 2008.

Larson is also the author of Rosemary: The Hidden Kennedy Daughter, about Rosemary Kennedy, the disabled sister of President John F. Kennedy. [Houghton, Mifflin, Harcourt October 2015.]

Awards and honors
 Wilbur H. Siebert Award, National Park Service Network to Freedom Program, for outstanding research on Harriet Tubman, her community, and the Underground Railroad. September 2015.
 Commendation, South Carolina House of Representatives Resolution, Bill 4234, for “significant work” on the life of Harriet Tubman. March 2013.
 Education Excellence Award 2007, Maryland Historical Trust. For the Finding a Way to Freedom Harriet Tubman Underground Railroad Tour, Dorchester and Caroline counties, Maryland.
 Legacy Fellowship, American Antiquarian Society, Worcester, Mass.
 Price Research Fellowship, William L. Clements Library, University of Michigan
 Fellowship, John Nicholas Brown Center for the Study of American Civilization, Brown University
 University Dissertation Fellowship, University of New Hampshire
 Margaret Storrs Grierson Scholar-in-Residence Fellowship, Sophia Smith Collection, Smith College, Northampton, Mass.
 Mary Catherine Mooney Fellowship, Boston Athenaeum
 and other fellowship and research enhancement awards from the University of New Hampshire.

See also
 Kate Larson in Harriet Tubman

References

Further reading

External links 
 
 http://www.harriettubmanbiography.com/ Kate Larson's Harriet Tubman website.
 https://web.archive.org/web/20060917003850/http://www.virginia.edu/uvanewsmakers/newsmakers/larson.html
 February 10, 2004 Boston Athenaeum lecture
 Review of recent Tubman biographies
 Underground Railroad Research Forum User Profile: Kate Clifford Larson
 NPS Harriet Tubman Special Resource Study

University of New Hampshire alumni
Simmons University alumni
Northeastern University alumni
21st-century American historians
Living people
American women historians
21st-century American women writers
Year of birth missing (living people)